The following are the results of the Skeet competition at the 1972 Summer Olympics.  All three medalists had a tied score of 195.  A shoot off was held, in the shoot off 1970 world champion, Konrad Wirnhier of West Germany hit all 25 birds  to claim the gold.  Earlier in the competition co-world record holder Yury Tsuranov of the Soviet Union disagreed with a ruling on a lost bird, and walked off the field.  For his actions he penalized three birds.  This brought his score down to 192, exactly three birds short for the shoot off for the gold medal.

Final 
The format was: 200 targets.  Four rounds of 25 targets for a total of 100 targets in each day.  Ties for the medals were broken with a shoot off, all other ties are broken by the best score in round 8, if still tied after that it goes to round 7 and continues until the tie is broken.

References

External links
Official report pg. 234

Shooting at the 1972 Summer Olympics